Sarabands is the first compilation album by gothic rock band Corpus Delicti. It has been counted among the "key sounds" of gothic rock by the Canadian Exclaim! magazine.

Track listing
"Noxious (The Demon's Game)" – 6:13
"Saraband" – 5:29
"The Shelter" – 3:35
"Absent Friend" – 3:20
"Dusk of Hallows" – 5:07
"Staring" – 4:10
"Circle" – 2:44
"Patient" – 4:41
"Masquerade" – 4:38
"Sylphes" – 4:32
"Suffragette City" – 3:23
"Poisoned Dead Flowers" – 6:21
"Twilight" – 4:06
"Empty" – 4:45

Lyrics by Sebastien, music by Corpus Delicti

References

Corpus Delicti (band) compilation albums
1996 compilation albums
Cleopatra Records compilation albums